Stargazer may refer to:

 an observational astronomer, particularly an amateur

Aerospace
 Stargazer (aircraft), a Lockheed L-1011 airliner used to launch the Pegasus rocket
 Orbiting Astronomical Observatory 2, nicknamed Stargazer, the first successful space telescope
 Star Gazers, a five-minute astronomy show on public television

Fictional media
 Mobile Suit Gundam SEED C.E. 73: Stargazer, a storyline in the series Gundam SEED Destiny
 Stargazer, a werewolf tribe in the game Werewolf: The Apocalypse
 Stargazer (novel), a book in the Evernight series by Claudia Gray
 Stargazer (Patrick Carman), a book in the Land of Elyon series by Patrick Carman
 The Stargazer, a fictional character in the epilogue of Mass Effect 3 played by Buzz Aldrin
 Star Trek: Stargazer, a series of Star Trek novels
 Commander Stargazer, the leader of the Silverhawks

Music

Artists
 The Stargazers (vocal ensemble)
 The Stargazers (band)
 Stargazer (record producer)

Songs
 "Stargazer" (Siouxsie and the Banshees song)
 "Stargazer" (The Tea Party song)
 "Stargazer" (Rainbow song), also covered by Dream Theater, Lana Lane and Týr
 "Stargazer", a song by Rx Bandits on the album Gemini, Her Majesty
 "Stargazer", a song by Mother Love Bone on the album Apple
 "Stargazer", a song by Neil Diamond on the album Beautiful Noise
 "Stargazers", a song by Nightwish on the album Oceanborn
 "Stargazers", a song by Avantasia on the album Angel of Babylon
 "Stargazer", a song by Filipino band Sponge Cola
 "Stargazer", a song by Kingdom Come on the album In Your Face
 "Stargazer", a song from the Local Hero soundtrack by Mark Knopfler

Albums and EPs
 Stargazer, a 1971 album by Shelagh McDonald
 Stargazer, 1979 album by Peter Brown
 Stargazer, 1980 album by Armen Donelian
 Stargazer (album), 1997 album by trumpeter Dave Douglas
 Stargazer, 1999 EP by Deepsky
 Stargazer, 2006 album by Shane Alexander
 Stargazer, 2012 album by Black Majesty
 Stargazer (EP), 2020 EP by JO1
 Stargazer (Marti Pellow album), 2021

Other uses
Stargazer (fish), a fish from one of eight genera noted for its upward-pointing eyes
 Lilium 'Stargazer', a lily flower
 Star Gazers' Stone, marks the spot of an observatory used by Charles Mason and Jeremiah Dixon
 Hyundai Stargazer, a minivan
 Stargazer, the initial product of Tele-TV, a video on demand service